Mierovo is a village and municipality in the Dunajská Streda District in the Trnava Region of south-west Slovakia.

Geography
The municipality lies at an altitude of 124 metres and covers an area of 6.192 km².

History
In the 9th century, the territory of Mierovo became part of the Kingdom of Hungary. The village was first recorded in 1260 by its Hungarian name as Weke. Until the end of World War I, it was part of Hungary and fell within the Somorja district of Pozsony County. After the Austro-Hungarian army disintegrated in November 1918, Czechoslovak troops occupied the area. After the Treaty of Trianon of 1920, the village became officially part of Czechoslovakia. In November 1938, the First Vienna Award granted the area to Hungary and it was held by Hungary until 1945. After Soviet occupation in 1945, Czechoslovak administration returned and the village became officially part of Czechoslovakia in 1947.

Demography 
In 1910, the village had 388, for the most part, Hungarian inhabitants. At the 2001 Census the recorded population of the village was 419 while an end-2008 estimate by the Statistical Office had the villages's population as 419. As of 2001, 82,34 per cent of its population was Hungarian while 15,27 per cent was Slovak. Roman Catholicism is the majority religion of the village, its adherents numbering 89.50% of the total population.

References 

Villages and municipalities in Dunajská Streda District
Hungarian communities in Slovakia